The 1930 Dhubri earthquake occurred on  near Dhubri, India (then British India). It had a magnitude of  7.1. Most of the buildings were damaged in Dhubri and the surrounding areas. This earthquake did not cause any fatalities. The maximum intensity was IX (Devastating tremor) on the Rossi–Forel scale near Dhubri.

See also
 List of earthquakes in 1930
 List of earthquakes in India

References

External links

Earthquakes in Assam
Dhubri Earthquake, 1930
1930 in India
Dhubri district
1930
1930 disasters in India